"The Lumberjack" is a song by American rock group Jackyl. It was released in 1992 as the band's debut single.

History
The song is noted for a chainsaw solo played by Dupree. William Phillips and Brian Cogan in the Encyclopedia of Heavy Metal Music referred to it as a "somewhat corny novelty hit".

The song's music video features John David Kaldoner, then the A&R executive of Geffen Records, portraying a lumberjack. Greg Vernon was the video's director.

Chart performance

Weekly charts

Year-end charts

References

External links

1992 debut singles
1992 songs
Jackyl songs
Geffen Records singles
Song recordings produced by Brendan O'Brien (record producer)